The Dude's Experience with a Girl on a Tandem, also known as The Dude and the Bathing Girl, is a silent, comedy film made in August 1898 by the American Mutoscope and Biograph Company. The film location was Far Rockaway, Queens, New York City, New York.

Plot
The plot revolves around a young man on the beach who is persuaded to join a lady in a bathing costume on a tandem bicycle, during which she drives it into the water, when he is dragged off the tandem into the water by the other girls on the beach.

External links

www.columbiaspectator.com
http://www.afi.com/members/catalog/DetailView.aspx?s=&Movie=31736

1898 films
1890s American films
American silent short films
American black-and-white films
1898 comedy films
Silent American comedy films
American comedy short films
1898 short films
Films shot in New York City